The  is the 8th edition of the Japan Film Professional Awards. It awarded the best of 1998 in film. The ceremony took place on April 17, 1999, at Theatre Shinjuku in Tokyo.

Awards 
Best Film: Hebi no Michi
Best Director: Itsumichi Isomura (Give It All)
Best Actress: Rena Tanaka (Give It All)
Best Actor: Show Aikawa (Hebi no Michi, Kumo no Hitomi)
Best Supporting Actor: Kazuma Suzuki (Orokamono: Kizu Darake no Tenshi)
Best New Encouragement: Seiichi Tanabe (Blues Harp)
Best New Encouragement: Hinano Yoshikawa (Tokyo Eyes)
Best New Director: Yoshimasa Ishibashi (Kuruwasetaino)
Special: Kameari Meigaza (The theatre used to play softcore pornographic films called Roman porno. It closed in 1999.)

10 best films
 Hebi no Michi (Kiyoshi Kurosawa)
 Give It All (Itsumichi Isomura)
 Love & Pop (Hideaki Anno)
 A, Haru (Shinji Sōmai)
 Orokamono: Kizu Darake no Tenshi (Junji Sakamoto)
 The Bird People in China (Takashi Miike)

References

External links
  

Japan Film Professional Awards
1999 in Japanese cinema
Japan Film Professional Awards
April 1999 events in Asia